Sonia Evelyn Drew Cornwall (née Cowan, 1919 – 2006) was a Canadian painter and rancher. She is in the British Columbia Cowboy Hall of Fame.

Biography
Cornwall was born in Kamloops in 1919, the daughter of Charles and Vivian Cowan. Cornwall's mother, Vivian, had artistic leanings studying at the Banff School of Fine Arts and making friends with A.Y. Jackson.

After the death of her father in 1939, Cornwall, along with her mother and sister, became involved in the operation of the two family ranches, the Onward Ranch and the 150 Mile Ranch.

The Onward Ranch was a destination for a variety of Canadian artists Including A.Y. Jackson, Joseph Plaskett, Herbert Siebner, and Takao Tanabe.

In 1945, Vivian and Sonia along with Jackson created the Cariboo Art Society.

In 1946, at the age of 27 Cornwall enrolled at the Provincial Institute of Technology in Calgary, but dropped out after three months. She continued painting, learning techniques from books and radio programs.

In 1947 she married Hugh Cornwall, a fellow rancher. Together they worked on the family's two ranches. They eventually sold both ranches, retaining 2,500 acres that became the Jones Lake Ranch.

Cornwall's painting reflect her surroundings and life. Her subject matter includes Cariboo landscapes and ranch life as well as First Nations subjects.

In 1981 Cornwall co-founded the Station House Gallery  which is located in the renovated BCR Station House in Williams Lake, B.C.

Cornwall died in 2006.

References

1919 births
2006 deaths
20th-century Canadian painters
20th-century Canadian women artists
Canadian women painters
People from Kamloops
Artists from British Columbia